I Was Trying to Describe You To Someone is the fourth studio album by American melodic hardcore band, Crime in Stereo.  It was released on February 23, 2010 on Bridge Nine Records. The band released a new song, "Drugwolf", on their MySpace page on January 19, 2010.

Critical reception 

The record received a review of 4.5/5 in the March 2010 issue of Alternative Press magazine. The magazine described it as an "equally ambitious, unpredictable follow-up..." to their third release ...Is Dead.

Exclaim! named "I Was Trying to Describe You To Someone" as the No. 5 Punk Album of 2010.

Track listing 
 "Queue Moderns" - 1:59
 "Drugwolf" - 3:53
 "Exit Halo" - 5:45
 "Not Dead" - 3:21
 "Odalisque" - 3:45
 "Young" - 3:50
 "Type One" - 3:52
 "Republica" - 4:13
 "I Am Everything I Am Not" - 3:57
 "Dark Island City" - 2:23
 "I Cannot Answer You Tonight" - 3:05

References

2010 albums
Crime in Stereo albums
Bridge 9 Records albums
Albums produced by Mike Sapone